Anglesey is an island and county of Wales, UK.

Anglesey may also refer to:

Communities
 Anglesey, Staffordshire, a civil parish in England
 County of Anglesey, Victoria, Australia

Industry
 Anglesey Aluminium, a metal manufacturer in Wales
 Anglesey Coalfield, in Wales
 Anglesey Mining, a mining company based in Wales

Sports
 Anglesey Circuit, a motor racing circuit in Wales
 Anglesey League, a former football (soccer) league in Wales
 Anglesey Stakes, a horse race in Ireland

Titles
 Earl of Anglesey, a defunct hereditary title in the Peerage of England
 Countess of Anglesey (disambiguation)Countess of Anglesey, a title normally given to the wife of the Earl of Anglesey
 Marquess of Anglesey, an extant hereditary title of British peerage seated on the Welsh island

Transportation
 Anglesey Airport, an airport owned by the Isle of Anglesey County Council
 Anglesey Central Railway, a former standard-gauge railway in Wales
 Anglesey Sidings, a former part of a railway terminal in the West Midlands, England
 TSS Anglesey (1887), a steam turbine cargo vessel scrapped in 1910

Other
 Anglesey Abbey, northeast of Cambridge, England
 Anglesey Coastal Path, in Wales
 Anglesey Sea Zoo, in Wales

See also
 
 Anglesea (disambiguation)